Han Zhubin (born February 1932) was Procurator-General of the Supreme People's Procuratorate and is the former President of China Law Society.

Biography
A native to Harbin, Heilongjiang, Han Zhubin joined the Communist Party of China in 1950.

Han worked in the railway system since 1946.  He was the Minister of Railways from 1992 to 1998, and the Procurator-General of the Supreme People's Procuratorate from 1998 to 2003.

Han served as a Deputy Secretary of the Central Commission for Discipline Inspection (CCDI) and as a member of the 15th CCDI Standing Committee in the period 1997–2002.

References

External links
Han Zhubin's profile, Xinhuanet.

1932 births
Living people
People's Republic of China politicians from Heilongjiang
Politicians from Harbin
Procurator-General of the Supreme People's Procuratorate